Kierkegaard  is a Danish surname, literally meaning church farm or church yard and colloquially meaning graveyard. Note that the double a is equivalent of å in common nouns and is retained from the pre-1948 orthography in proper nouns only.

Notable people with the surname include:

Christer Kierkegaard (1918–1999), Swedish Navy rear admiral
Niels Christian Kierkegaard (1806-1882), Danish painter
Peter Kierkegaard (1805–1888), Danish theologian
Søren Kierkegaard (1813–1855), Danish philosopher
Sylvia Kierkegaard (1952–2015), Philippine law scholar
Emil Kirkegaard, creator of OpenPsych

See also 
Helene Kirkegaard (born 1971), Danish badminton player

Danish-language surnames